List of bus routes for TheBus in Honolulu.

Bus route and services subject to change according to traffic, detours, and extreme bus delays. If service was not as described, check with TheBus website or consult TheBus customer service to confirm changes before editing.

TheBus made route changes that took place in 2012. A new numbering system is taking effect that will see several routes renumbered based on the area the routes services and to utilize them as part of the under construction HART light rail project that is expected to be finished in 2024, depending on the completion. On March 4, 2018, preparation for the new numbering system took effect, which changed one bus route number based on the area the route services. On March 3, 2019, the first phase took effect. A second phase went into effect June 3, 2019. A third phase went into effect August 18, 2019.

Standard routes

Routes serving downtown Honolulu
Bus routes serving Downtown Honolulu and Ala Moana Center are shown in Blue.
Bus routes serving Downtown Honolulu only are shown in Red.
Bus routes serving Downtown Honolulu/Ala Moana Center and Windward Oʻahu are shown in Brown.

Routes serving areas outside downtown Honolulu
Bus routes serving Ala Moana Center only are featured in Orange
Bus routes serving Wahiawā only are featured in Purple
Bus routes serving Kalihi only are featured in  Pink
Bus routes serving Waipahu only are featured in Yellow
Bus routes  serving Pālolo Valley only are featured in Aqua
Bus routes serving Kāhala Mall only are featured in Gray
All other bus routes will be featured in plain black font.

Express routes
 Buses whose terminating or servicing point is at Kalihi Transit Center are featured in Orange
 Buses whose terminating or servicing point is at Kapolei Transit Center are featured in Blue
 Buses whose terminating or servicing point is at Waipahu Transit Center are featured in Red
 Buses whose terminating or servicing point is at Alapaʻi Transit Center are featured in Green

City/Country Express Routes (Daily Service)

Limited service

Express Routes (Weekdays AM/PM hours only)

Joint Base Pearl Harbor/Hickam Express Routes (Weekdays AM/PM hours only)

Waikīkī Express routes (AM and PM seven days a week)
 Buses serving Waikīkī are featured in Gold

Community access routes

Transit Centers and Transfer Points

References

Routes
Bus transportation in Hawaii
TheBus routes
TheBus routes